Mandaue City is the industrial capital of the province of Cebu in the Philippines. It is a 1st class highly urbanized city in the Central Visayas region of the Philippines.

History

Mandaue has had a number of types of leadership. Mandaue was ruled by a chieftain, Aponoaan who gave tribute to the Spanish a later known chief is Lambusan. When Spain subdued these islands the Jesuits were stationed in Mandaue in 1599, with their chief Andug at the time. The priests and were given authority among these people until 1768 which they were expelled, the Recollects replaced them in 1898. After the displacement of the capital to Manila, so Cebu and the neighboring pueblos were out from the limelight. Capitanes, Cabeza de Barangay, and Tenientes, assumed as heads of the town, many vied for progress but their struggles had no effect since implementation and communication were a problem that were hard to overcome. In 1898, The Central Revolutionary Government formed a new society led by Leonicio Eje, but that was short lived after the American Troops came in 1899. In 1901, a combat took place in Mandaue which was nearly destroyed, the westerners came victorious by this time the head was the Municipal President and instigation of projects were abundant and the society adapted to the American Republic form of government. The town of Consolacion, which was once a part of Mandaue they separated because of the distance of the Capital and the Church, which happened on 1920.

The Japanese desired to make a Greater East Asian Co-Prosperity Sphere and Mandaue was included. She was finally free from any colonizers on the 4th of July 1945. The rapid progress after two the wars led to the signing of the City Charter on August 30, 1969 under Republic Act No 5519. On September 21, 1972, Philippine President Ferdinand Marcos ordered martial law to extend his term, the military this time was highly influential and laws were strictly implemented, this rampant epoch was ended by the Edsa Revolution. In 1991, Mandaue became one of the highly-urbanized cities of The Philippines, but Mandaue’s unique city carter allows residents to vote for provincial officials surpassing the codes for highly-urbanized cities in the Philippine constitution.

Politics

The following officiated as Presidents under the Commonwealth: Leoncio Jayme (1899), Elias Espina (1900–1901), Benito Ceniza (1901), Fabiano Suyco (1902–1903), Benigno Suyco (1904–1907, 1910–1911), Luis Espina (1908–1909), Segunda Jayme (1912–1919), Alejandro del Rosal (1919–1925, 1934–1940), Ariston Cortes (1925–1934, 1943, 1945), Alejandro Fortuna (1941–1943), and Santiago Suyco (1943).

These men served as Mayors: Martin Echivarre (1945–1946), Eustaquio Rosal (1946), Eriberto Dimpas (1947), Apolinar Cortes (1947), Pedro Basubas (1947), Fabiano Pesons (1948–1951), Ubano Seno (1952–1955), Apolonio Gonzaga (1956–1959), Conrado Seno (1960–1963), Demetrio Cortes Sr. (1964–1986), Vicente De la Cerna (1986), Restituto Soon (1987), Alfredo Ouano (1988–1998), Thadeo Ouano (1999–2007), Amadeo Seno (2007), Jonas Cortes (2007–2016; 2019-present), and Luigi Quisumbing (2016-2019).

References

Politics of Mandaue